The following is a list of current and historic aircraft of the South African Air Force.

Current aircraft
2023

Historic aircraft
Aircraft types no longer in service.

Notes

References

South African Air Force
South African Air Force

South African military-related lists
South Africa transport-related lists